Trianon is a 45-story,  skyscraper in the Westend-Süd district of Frankfurt, Germany, completed in 1993. It is the headquarters for DekaBank; other tenants are Deutsche Bundesbank and Franklin Templeton. Atop the building is an inverted pyramid suspended from the three corners.

The Trianon's layout is roughly the shape of an equilateral triangle, the corners of which are formed by three-sided towers. The end is an inverted three-sided pyramid on the roof. It is the first structure in Germany to use high-strength concrete.

Ownership
In 2007, DekaBank sold the building to the Morgan Stanley European Office Fund (MSEOF). A 57% interest in the building was later transferred to the real estate investment fund Morgan Stanley P2 Value.

Gallery

Skyscrapers in Frankfurt

See also
 List of tallest buildings in Frankfurt
 List of tallest buildings in Germany
 List of tallest buildings in the European Union
 List of tallest buildings in Europe

References

External links
Trianon in SKYLINE ATLAS
A View On Cities

Office buildings completed in 1993
Skyscrapers in Frankfurt
Bankenviertel
Skyscraper office buildings in Germany